Pezzolo Valle Uzzone is a comune (municipality) in the Province of Cuneo in the Italian region Piedmont, located about  southeast of Turin and about  northeast of Cuneo.

Pezzolo Valle Uzzone borders the following municipalities: Bergolo, Castelletto Uzzone, Cortemilia, Levice, Piana Crixia, and Serole.

References

Cities and towns in Piedmont